Events from the year 1810 in Sweden

Incumbents
 Monarch – Charles XIII

Events
 6 January - Treaty of Paris (1810)
 7 January - The newly elected heir to the throne, Charles August, arrives in Sweden. 
 28 May - Charles August, Crown Prince of Sweden dies. Rumors suspect poisoning by the Gustavian Party.
 May - Maria Nilsdotter i Ölmeskog dissolves a potential rebel army and are rewarded by the monarch for having prevented a rebellion. 
 20 June - Fersen murder: Axel von Fersen the Younger, a member of the Gustavian Party, is killed by a lynch mob in Stockholm suspected of having murdered Charles August. 
 21 August - Jean Baptiste Bernadotte is elected the new heir to the Swedish throne. 
 20 October - Jean Baptiste Bernadotte arrives in Sweden. 
 2 November - Jean Baptiste Bernadotte makes his formal entry in Stockholm and takes the name Charles John. 
 2 November - The Swedish Act of Succession is passed. 
 5 November - Jean Baptiste Bernadotte is formally adopted by Charles XIII.
 7 November - Anglo-Swedish War (1810–12)
 22 December - The spouse and son of Jean Baptiste Bernadotte, Désirée Clary and the future Oscar I, arrives in Sweden.
 The Smådalarö Gård is completed. 
 Johan Olof Wallin inducted to the Swedish Academy.
 The right of an unmarried woman to be declared of legal majority by royal dispensation are officially confirmed by parliament.
 The execution of Metta Fock.

Births

 20 May – Sara Augusta Malmborg, singer, pianist and painter (died 1860)
 7 June - Carl August Adlersparre, chamberlain (1838), poet, novelist and historian  (died 1862) 
 16 October – Carl Wahlbom, artist (died 1858)

Deaths
 19 March – Louis Masreliez, artist (born 1748) 
 28 May - Charles August, Crown Prince of Sweden, crown prince (born 1768) 
 20 June - Axel von Fersen the Younger, courtier, military, diplomat (born 1755) 
 17 September - Ulla von Höpken, courtier profile of the Gustavian Age (born 1749) 
 - Hedvig Amalia Charlotta Klinckowström, artist (born 1777)

References

External links

 
Years of the 19th century in Sweden
Sweden